"Love That Man" is a song by American R&B-pop singer Whitney Houston. It was written by Kenneth "Babyface" Edmonds, Rob Fusari, Calvin Gaines, Eritza Laues, Bill Lee, and Balewa Muhammad for her fifth studio album Just Whitney (2002), with production helmed by Edmonds and Fusari. The song was released as the album's fourth and final single in May 2003. Commissioned as a remix single in the United States, Peter Rauhofer and The Pound Boys produced remixes of the song. "Love That Man" became Houston's 12th number-one hit on the US Billboard Hot Dance Club Play chart.

Background
"Love That Man" was written by Babyface, Rob Fusari, Calvin Gaines, Eritza Laues, Bill Lee, and Balewa Muhammad, while production was helmed by Babyface and Fusari. Commenting on his involvement with Just Whitney, Fusari said: "Arista liked my song "Love That Man," and they wanted me to produce it on Whitney’s new album [...] They flew me down to Miami to work with Whitney on this song. I ended up co-producing this song with Babyface."

Critical reception
BBC Music reviewer Keysha Davids found that "Love That Man" sounds "suspiciously like an ode to her much criticised hubby. Here Whitney comes across as soulful and sincere as she ooohs and aaahs in the right places. The mid-tempo track harks back to 80s soul with its simple bass line, and unfussy production." Joan Anderman of The Boston Globe panned the single with "stands by her bad boy."

Track listings
All tracks written by Kenneth "Babyface" Edmonds, Rob Fusari, Calvin Gaines, Eritza Laues, Bill Lee, and Balewa Muhammad.

Notes
 denotes additional producer

Credits and personnel
Credits lifted from the liner notes of Just Whitney.

Babyface – producer, writer
Rob Fusari – producer, writer
Calvin Gaines – writer
Eric Kupper – keyboards

Eritza Laues – writer
Bill Lee – writer
George O. Luksch – keyboards
Balewa Muhammad – writer

Charts

Weekly charts

Year-end charts

Release history

See also
List of number-one dance singles of 2003 (U.S.)

References

External links

2002 songs
Whitney Houston songs
Songs written by Babyface (musician)
Song recordings produced by Babyface (musician)
Songs written by Rob Fusari
2003 singles
Arista Records singles